Qeshlaq-e Tulkilu may refer to:
Qeshlaq-e Tulkilu Gol Moradi
Qeshlaq-e Tulkilu Gujehlar